Feeding Frenzy is a four-part American documentary reality television mini-series that premiered in 2008 on Animal Planet. The program follows, stars, and is hosted and narrated by actor Christopher Douglas. In the show, Douglas sits inside a transparent, cubical plastic box while filming canivorous predators, which are attracted to the bait and surround the box.

Parts

See also
Animal Planet
List of programs broadcast by Animal Planet

References

External links

Animal Planet original programming
2000s American reality television series
2008 American television series debuts
2008 American television series endings 
Television series about mammals